These are the results of the Men's Pole Vault event at the 2001 World Championships in Athletics in Edmonton, Alberta, Canada.

Medalists

Schedule
All times are Mountain Standard Time (UTC-7)

Records

Results

Qualification
7 August

Group A

Group B

Final
9 August

References
Results
IAAF

P
Pole vault at the World Athletics Championships